Nichijū (日什) (1314–1392) was an early Nichiren Buddhist who founded the Nichijū-ha subsect, the origin of Kempon Hokke. He was converted from Tendai Buddhism by Nichijin in 1379, at the age of 65.

1314 births
1392 deaths
Nichiren Buddhist monks